One in a Million is a 1936 American musical comedy film directed by Sidney Lanfield and starring Sonja Henie, Adolphe Menjou and Don Ameche. It marked the Hollywood debut of the ice skater Henie. It was the first of a series of Twentieth Century-Fox musicals made by Henie, although she had previously made a silent film in her native Norway. The film features footage from the 1936 Winter Olympic Games.

Choreographer Jack Haskell received an Academy Award nomination in Best Dance Direction at the 9th Academy Awards. One in a Million proved to be one of the highest-grossing films of 1937.

Plot
American showman Thaddeus Spencer (Adolphe Menjou) is stuck without money in the Swiss Alps with his wife Billie (Arline Judge), a girls' band, a comedy trio (The Ritz Brothers) and a recent harmonica-playing discovery (Borrah Minevitch) when the group learns that the Grand Palace Hotel in Ardetz, where they were to perform, has burned down. Upon seeing Greta Muller (Sonja Henie), an innkeeper's daughter, ice-skate, Spencer has a vision of her performing with a skating ballet that will make him millions. He arranges for her to skate in a tryout performance at a St. Moritz casino for which he will be paid 950 francs.

American reporter Bob Harris (Don Ameche) from the Paris Herald arrives at the inn to investigate the hotel fire which, rumor has it, was an attempt to kill a European premier. Bob has his photographer, Danny Simpson (Ned Sparks), trail Ratoffsky (Montagu Love), a suspicious-looking bearded guest, and tries to romance Greta, who is sullen after a band member has Bob massage her neck.

When Bob learns that Greta's father Heinrich Muller (Jean Hersholt), a 1908 Olympic figure skating champion who lost his medal because he accepted money as a gift for teaching, has trained Greta for twelve years for the upcoming Olympics, he follows the troupe to St. Moritz and stops Greta after her first number, warning that she is risking her Olympic eligibility. Unaware that her exhibition involved money, Greta is grateful to Bob as they ride back on a sleigh.

At the Olympics, Greta wins first place in figure skating, but when she refuses to turn professional and skate for Spencer in New York, he threatens to expose her St. Moritz performance to the ruling committee. Heinrich returns Greta's medals himself when he learns of the St. Moritz exhibition, but Bob takes Spencer to explain the situation to the secretary of the committee, Sir Frederick Brooks (Montagu Love), who earlier was vacationing in the Alps incognito as Ratoffsky. As Greta has received no payment and Spencer has used all the money he received for expenses, Brooks declares Greta's eligibility proven, and the whole troupe, with Greta now as the star, performs in Madison Square Garden.

Cast
 Sonja Henie as Greta Muller
 Adolphe Menjou as Thaddeus Spencer
 Jean Hersholt as Heinrich Muller
 Ned Sparks as Danny Simpson
 Don Ameche as Bob Harris
 The Ritz Brothers as Themselves
 Arline Judge as Billie Spencer
 Borrah Minevitch as Adolphe
 Borrah Minevitch and His Harmonica Rascals as Harmonica Ensemble
 Dixie Dunbar as Goldie
 Julius Tannen as Chapelle
 Montagu Love as Ratoffsky, alias "Sir Frederick Brooks, Olympic Secretary"
 Gwen Lee as Kitty Kennedy
 Girls' band: Leah Ray, Shirley Deane, June Gale, Lillian Porter, Helen Ericson, Diane Cook, Bonnie Bannon, June Wilkins, Clarice Sherry, and Pauline Craig

Awards 
Jack Haskell nominated for Best Dance Direction

Reception
Filmink called it "A grab bag of a movie. Plays like a variety show with a whole collection of acts. Fascinating to see how they protect [Henie]."

References

External links
 

1936 films
1936 musical comedy films
American musical comedy films
20th Century Fox films
Films about Olympic figure skating
Films set in Switzerland
Films set in the Alps
Films about the 1936 Winter Olympics
American black-and-white films
Films scored by Louis Silvers
1930s English-language films
1930s American films